Lipetsky (masculine), Lipetskaya (feminine), or Lipetskoye (neuter) may refer to:
Lipetsky District, a district of Lipetsk Oblast, Russia
Lipetsk Oblast (Lipetskaya oblast), a federal subject of Russia